David W. Garside is an inventor and former project engineer at BSA's Umberslade Hall research facility. He is notable for having developed an air-cooled twin-rotor Wankel motorcycle engine which powered the Norton Classic road bike. Although the Classic was not the first production rotary-engined bike, it was significantly lighter, smoother, more powerful and better-handling than the contemporary Suzuki RE5.

Personal history
In his book "Norton Rotaries", Kris Perkins states that "David Garside could rightly be called the father of the Norton Rotary". Garside studied mathematics and mechanical engineering at Emmanuel College, Cambridge, where he obtained a first class degree. He served an apprenticeship with Rolls-Royce, and after a spell at the CEGB, he returned to Rolls-Royce to work on diesel rotaries. He later moved to BSA as a development engineer at Kitts Green. After BSA was subsumed into NVT, over 90% of BSA's research projects were cancelled, but Garside managed to persuade NVT's boss, Dennis Poore to continue with the rotary programme. The project moved to Shenstone, near Lichfield, where production of bikes such as the Interpol took place.

The Norton Classic

Garside, who had been impressed by the Fichtel & Sachs engine in the DKW Hercules bike, installed a bought-in F&S air-cooled single-rotor engine into a BSA B25 'Starfire' frame as a "proof of concept". This proved reliable and smooth, but under-powered. Garside then created a prototype twin-rotor engine (with F&S rotors), which doubled the capacity of the earlier test "mule". This twin-rotor engine was installed in a BSA A65 frame.

Wankel engines run very hot, so Garside gave this air-cooled motor additional interior air-cooling. Filtered air was drawn through an intake that was forward-facing to provide a ram air effect. This air was channelled initially to the rotating mainshaft and through the interior of the two rotors, then entering a large pressed-steel plenum before entering the combustion chambers via twin carburettors. The plenum, which doubled as the bike's semi-monocoque frame, enabled the transfer of much of the heat to the surrounding atmosphere. (This idea was taken from the monocoque Ariel Arrow). The carburation process further reduced temperatures via the heat of evaporation.

Even so, at  the fuel-air mixture was still hotter than ideal, and the engine's volumetric efficiency remained somewhat impaired. The eccentric shaft's main bearings and the inlet manifolds were fed by oil-injection lubrication, and the fuel-air mix also carried residual mist of oil from the interior of the rotors, which helped to lubricate the rotor tips.

Notable inventions 
To address the deficiencies of the air-cooled Norton Wankel engine, Garside went on to develop SPARCS (self-pressurising-air rotor cooling system), a system that utilises self-pressurising blow-by gases as a cooling medium, absorbing higher levels of heat from the engine core and dispersing the heat by means of an external heat exchanger. This system provides superior heat rejection than standard air cooling methods.

In addition to SPARCS, Garside also filed a patent in 2011 to develop a rotary exhaust expander unit or CREEV (compound rotary engine for electric vehicles) for use with Wankel rotary engines. The CREEV system acts as an ‘exhaust reactor’ by consuming unburned exhaust products while expansion occurs, reducing overall emissions and improving thermal efficiency.

In 2015, David Garside signed a licensing agreement with UK Midlands based engineers Advanced Innovative Engineering (UK) Ltd for exclusive use of his patents in their next generation Wankel rotary engines.

Aero-engine derivative
The Norton Wankel engine was further developed at Staverton into the MidWest aero-engine. The MidWest engine's output increased from BSA's 85 bhp to nearly 110 bhp by improving volumetric efficiency. This was achieved by dumping overboard (rather than burning) the pressurised hot rotor cooling air, and by feeding fresh cool air into the combustion chambers.

References

External links
 Patents by David Garside
 Freedom Motors Consultants and Advisors
 Norton Classic at Rider magazine
 Advanced Innovative Engineering (UK) Ltd Patent Agreement

Year of birth missing (living people)
Living people
British automotive engineers
British motorcycle pioneers
British motorcycle designers